Anant Madabhushi (born February 15, 1976) is the Donnell Institute Professor of Biomedical Engineering at Case Western Reserve University (CWRU) in Cleveland, Ohio, USA and founding director of CWRU's Center for Computational Imaging and Personalized Diagnostics (CCIPD). He is also a Research Scientist at the Louis Stokes Cleveland Veterans Administration (VA) Medical Center in Cleveland, OH, USA. He holds secondary appointments in the Case Western Reserve University departments of Urology, Radiology, Pathology, Radiation Oncology, General Medical Sciences, Computer & Data Sciences, and Electrical, Computer and Systems Engineering.

In 2018, Prevention magazine included Madabhushi's work on “Smart Imaging Computers” for identifying lung cancer patients who could benefit from chemotherapy on a list called “The 10 Most Incredible Medical Breakthroughs of 2018”. In 2019, Madabhushi was one of five scientists included in a Nature magazine article titled, “Offbeat approaches to cancer research”.

Education 
Madabhushi received a bachelor's degree in biomedical engineering from Mumbai University, India in 1998 and a master's degree in biomedical engineering from the University of Texas, Austin, Texas, USA  in 2000. In 2004, he received his PhD in bioengineering from the University of Pennsylvania, USA.

Career 
Madabhushi was a professor in the Department of Biomedical Engineering at Rutgers, The State University of New Jersey, USA, from 2005-2012. In 2012, joined Case Western Reserve University's Department of Biomedical Engineering as an associate professor. At the time of this writing, Dr. Madabhushi holds the position of Donnell Institute Professor and serves as the director of the university's Center for Computational Imaging and Personalized Diagnostics (CCIPD).

Awards and memberships 
Madabhushi has 75 patents issued in the areas of medical image analysis, computer-aided diagnosis and computer vision.

Madabhushi was a recipient of the Fiscal Year 2017 Lung Cancer Research Program Investigator-Initiated Translational Research Award of the Department of Defense Congressionally Directed Medical Research Programs. He was a recipient of the Fiscal Year 2017 Lung Cancer Research Program Investigator-Initiated Translational Research Award of the Department of Defense Congressionally Directed Medical Research Programs. He has received awards including the Excellence in Teaching Award (2007-2009) from Rutgers University; and the Coulter Phase 1 and Phase 2 Early Career award (2006, 2008).

Madabhushi is a Fellow of the National Academy of Inventors, a Fellow of the American Institute of Medical and Biomedical Engineering (AIMBE), and a Fellow of the Institute of Electrical and Electronics Engineers (IEEE). In 2015, he was named to Crain's Cleveland Business magazine's “Forty Under 40” list.

In 2019, 2020 and 2021, Madabhushi was named to The Pathologist's Power List, an "annual celebration of the great and inspirational minds that underpin the medical laboratory".

Research 
With Madabhushi as founding director, the team at Case Western Reserve University's Center for Computational Imaging and Personalized Diagnostics (CCIPD) is “involved in various different aspects of developing, evaluating and applying novel quantitative image analysis, computer vision, signal processing, segmentation, multi-modal co-registration tools, pattern recognition, and machine learning tools for disease diagnosis, prognosis, and theragnosis in the context of breast, prostate, head and neck, and brain tumors as well as epilepsy and carotid plaque. Our group is also exploring the utility of these methods in studying correlations of disease markers across multiple scales, modalities, and functionalities -- from gene and protein expression to spectroscopy to digital pathology and to multi-parametric MRI."

Madabhushi has 21,836 academic citations as of November 11, 2021.

Madabhushi has secured funding from the National Institutes of Health, National Cancer Institute, Department of Defense, Department of Veterans Affairs, and other sources. Madabhushi has been involved in sponsored research and industry collaborations with companies including Siemens, Astrazeneca, Boehringer Ingelheim and Bristol Myers Squibb.

References 

Living people
1976 births
American biomedical engineers
University of Mumbai alumni
Cockrell School of Engineering alumni
Case Western Reserve University faculty
Fellows of the American Institute for Medical and Biological Engineering
Fellow Members of the IEEE